Jörn Svensson (13 February 1936 – 12 November 2021) was a Swedish politician. A member of the Left Party, he served in the Riksdag from 1971 to 1988 and the European Parliament from 1995 to 1999 as part of The Left in the European Parliament – GUE/NGL.

References

1936 births
2021 deaths
Danish emigrants to Sweden
Members of the Riksdag from the Left Party (Sweden)
Members of the Riksdag 1970–1973
Members of the Riksdag 1974–1976
Members of the Riksdag 1976–1979
Members of the Riksdag 1979–1982
Members of the Riksdag 1982–1985
Members of the Riksdag 1985–1988
European United Left–Nordic Green Left MEPs
MEPs 1994–1999
People from Frederiksberg